The Wages Councils Act 1945 (c. 17) was a UK Act of Parliament, concerning the setting of minimum wages and encouraging collective bargaining.   It played a central role in post-war UK labour law.  It was repealed by the Wages Act 1986.

See also
 UK labour law
 Trade Boards Act 1909
 Trade Boards Act 1918
 National Minimum Wage Act 1998

References

External links
 Second Reading in Hansard

United Kingdom labour law
United Kingdom Acts of Parliament 1945